Hickory Rock is an unincorporated community in east central Franklin County, North Carolina, United States. It is located at the intersection of Hickory Rock Road (SR 1421) and Ronald Tharrington Road (SR 1419), east-northeast of Louisburg, at an elevation of 394 feet (120 m).

References

Unincorporated communities in Franklin County, North Carolina
Unincorporated communities in North Carolina